The Living Tongues Institute for Endangered Languages (LTIEL) is a nonprofit 501 (c)(3) organization based in Salem, Oregon, United States. The institute's focus is to scientifically document endangered languages, as well as assist communities with maintaining and revitalizing knowledge of their native languages. The institute's founder and director is Dr. Gregory D. S. Anderson. The institute's Director of Research is Dr. K. David Harrison.

One of the institute's projects involves training indigenous youth who are not native speakers of their communities' traditional languages to record and document their elders' languages, in order to improve documentation of those languages and to "build pride" among speakers.

The institute reports that they have created over 100 online "living dictionaries". The Living Tongues Institute is partnered with National Geographic’s Enduring Voices Project as both Dr. Gregory D. S. Anderson and Dr. K David Harrison are National Geographic Fellows. Other partners include LA Academia de Lenguas Mayas de Guatemala and Ironbound Films: The Linguists.

Projects
Language projects
 Altai-Sayan Language and Ethnography Project
 Ös/Middle Chulym Documentation Project
 Eleme/Baan Language Project 
 Kallawaya Language Project
 Munda Languages Project
 Language Hotspots Project
 "Enduring Voices", a multi-year joint project with the National Geographic Society launched in 2007, with expeditions to language hotspots around the world (e.g., Bolivia, East India, Oklahoma, Oregon, Australia)
 The Linguists Film Project 
 Online Living Dictionary Projects
 Siletz Dee-Ni Language Talking Dictionary Project
Tuvan Talking Dictionary Project
Remo Talking Dictionary Project
Chamacoco Talking Dictionary Project
Ho Talking Dictionary Project
Matukar Talking Dictionary Project

See also
 Language death
 Language documentation
 Language isolate
 Language revival
 List of Language Self-Study Programs
 List of revived languages

References

External links
Living Tongues Institute for Endangered Languages (official website)
http://livingtongues.org/talking-dictionaries/ (Talking Dictionaries)
Enduring Voices Project: Endangered Languages Facts, Photos, Map from the National Geographic Society

Endangered languages projects
Organizations based in Salem, Oregon
Linguistics organizations
Native American language revitalization